Shamanur Mallikarjun (Kannada:ಶಾಮನೂರು ಮಲ್ಲಿಕಾರ್ಜುನ್) is a former Member of Legislative Assembly representing Davangere North in Karnataka Legislative Assembly. A former Minister for youth Welfare and Sports in the Government of Karnataka. He is the son of Industrialist and Cabinet Minister Shamanuru Shivashankarappa.

He is the Chairman of SS Institute of medical science and research center, Davangere. He lost to G. M. Siddeshwara in 2014 Lok Sabha elections. He also lost to S. A. Ravindranath in Karnataka State Assembly Elections-2018.

References

Karnataka MLAs 2013–2018
People from Davanagere
Living people
Indian National Congress politicians from Karnataka
1967 births